Aliabad-e Luleh (also Romanized as ‘Alīābād-e Lūleh, Ali Abad Looleh, and ‘Alīābād Lūleh; also known as ‘Alīābād) is a village in Baqeran Rural District, in the Central District of Birjand County, South Khorasan Province, Iran. At the 2006 census, its population was 389, in 102 families.

References 

Populated places in Birjand County